Devin Norse Wenig (born 1966) is an American business executive. From July 2015 to September 2019, Wenig was president and CEO of eBay. From April 2008 to August 2011, Wenig was CEO of Thomson Reuters Markets, the financial and media businesses of Thomson Reuters Corporation.

He is a director of General Motors and its subsidiary Cruise Automation, an autonomous vehicle company.

Early life
Devin Norse Wenig was born in Brooklyn, New York, the son of Carol Wenig and Jeffrey Wenig, a toxicologist, and founder and chief executive of Nastech Pharmaceutical Company of Hauppauge, Long Island.

Wenig earned a bachelor's degree from Union College, and a JD degree from Columbia University School of Law.

Career
At age 23, following his father's unexpected death, Wenig took over as CEO of then-struggling Nastech Pharmaceutical, raising $5 million in venture capital. After a year as CEO, he recruited a healthcare CEO and joined the law firm Cravath Swaine & Moore.

In 1993, Wenig joined Reuters, where he remained until 2011, becoming the company's no. 2 executive. From June 2006 to April 2008, Wenig was COO and a board member of Reuters Group plc. He assisted with the merger of Reuters Group with the Thomson Corporation, and then from April 2008 to August 2011, Wenig was CEO of Thomson Reuters Markets.

Wenig joined as president of eBay's global marketplaces business in September 2011.  When Wenig joined eBay, it had 99 million active users. During his time as marketplace chief, this rose to nearly 160 million, by focusing on "m-commerce", shopping on mobile devices. In October 2014, it was announced that once the eBay/PayPal demerger was complete, Wenig would become CEO of eBay, replacing John Donahoe. Wenig took over as CEO in July 2015 after eBay spun off PayPal.

In April 2018, he was elected to the General Motors' board of directors.

In September 2019, Wenig unexpectedly stood down as CEO of eBay, amid pressure from activist investors to break the company apart, and was immediately succeeded as interim CEO by Scott Schenkel, eBay's CFO. An internal eBay investigation found that, while Wenig’s communications were inappropriate, there was no evidence that he knew in advance about or authorized the actions that would later become the cyberstalking case. As the Company previously announced, there were a number of considerations leading to his departure from the Company.  He received a $57 million golden parachute package.

In June 2021, he was named to the Salesforce Global Advisory Board.

Cyberstalking incident

A cyberstalking and harassment campaign against the owners of the online newsletter, ECommerceBytes, occurred in 2019. This eventually led to charges against seven members of eBay's global security team. The harassment began after an article was published in ECommerceBytes about eBay's litigation against Amazon. Wenig texted a communications executive "If you are ever going to take her [ECommerceBytes writer Ina Steiner] down... now is the time." A subsequent cyberstalking and harassment campaign against the newsletter's authors led to charges against seven members of eBay's global security team. Wenig was not charged in the case.

Recognition 
In 2019, Wenig was ranked #100 in a Forbes list of America's 100 most innovative leaders. He was ranked eighth in Retail Info Systems' 2017 list of "Retail's 10 Best CEOs".

Personal life
On 28 March 1993, Wenig married Cindy Lee Horowitz, a lawyer, and fellow graduate of Columbia University School of Law in a ceremony at the Huntington (Long Island) Jewish Center.

References

1966 births
American corporate directors
EBay employees
Living people
Union College (New York) alumni
Columbia Law School alumni
People from Flatbush, Brooklyn
Businesspeople from New York (state)
New York (state) lawyers
Year of birth uncertain
Directors of eBay
20th-century American Jews
Cravath, Swaine & Moore people
American chief executives
American chief operating officers
American chief executives of Fortune 500 companies
21st-century American Jews